The 2010 All-Ireland Senior Club Camogie Championship for the leading clubs in the women's team field sport of camogie was won by Killimor (Gal), who defeated Inniscarra (Cork) in the final, played at Croke Park .

Arrangements
The championship was organised on the traditional provincial system used in Gaelic Games since the 1880s, with Oulart–The Ballagh and O'Donovan Rossa winning the championships of the other two provinces. Martina Conroy’s accuracy from placed balls secured Killimor a one-point victory over Oulart the Ballagh in the semi-final.

The Final
Brenda Hanney was player of the match as Killimor led by 2–4 to 0–1 at half time in the final, played at Croke Park for the first time since 1973, and went on to win by 20 points.

Final stages

References

External links
 Camogie Association

2010 in camogie
2010